Stephen Dennis Atwater (born October 28, 1966) is an American former professional football player who spent most of his career playing free safety for the Denver Broncos of the National Football League (NFL). Atwater and Dennis Smith made up a Broncos secondary that was known for their ferocious hits on opposing players. He was an eight-time Pro Bowl selection and two-time Super Bowl champion. Atwater was elected to the Pro Football Hall of Fame on February 1, 2020.

Early life
Atwater attended Lutheran High School North in St. Louis, Missouri and was the school's top athlete, playing football, basketball, and track. Atwater was selected all-conference and league Most Valuable Player as an option style quarterback. He credits his coach there, Mike Russell, as serving as a mentor for him both as a football player and becoming an exemplary citizen. Atwater also is sixth on Lutheran North's all-time passing yards in a season with 1,097 yards in his junior year.

College
Atwater signed with the University of Arkansas, where he was moved from quarterback to safety. He was named to the All-Southwest Conference team three times and named as an All-American twice. 

During his senior year, Atwater helped the 1988 Arkansas Razorbacks football team finish the season at 10-2 and win the Southwest Conference championship outright, but lost to UCLA and QB Troy Aikman in the 1989 Cotton Bowl Classic on New Year's Day. 1988 bookended his college career since Arkansas also finished 10-2 after beating Arizona State 18-17 in the 1985 Holiday Bowl during Atwater's freshman season. 

Helping Atwater's stock as a pro prospect was his appearance in the East-West Shrine Game, where he logged two interceptions. He was also named defensive most valuable player in the 1989 East-West Shrine Game.

He still holds the school record with 14 interceptions in his career.

In 1994, Atwater was named to the Razorback All-Century Team and the All-Decade Team for the 1980s. He was inducted into the University of Arkansas Sports Hall of Honor in 1998.

Professional career

Atwater was drafted out of the University of Arkansas by the Broncos with the 20th pick in the first round of the 1989 NFL Draft. The Broncos began the draft with the 13th overall pick and were hoping to upgrade their defense which had ranked 27th (out of a possible 28) against the run the previous year. Knowing that Atwater would be available in the later parts of the first round, the Broncos traded down to the 20th overall pick owned by the Cleveland Browns who selected Eric Metcalf with Denver's 13th overall pick.

New defensive coordinator Wade Phillips employed Atwater close to the line of scrimmage in order to fortify Denver's run defense and he led the team in tackles, finishing with 129 tackles his rookie season. Denver's defense jumped 20 spots to finish 7th against the run and tied for 3rd best in yards per carry with a 3.7-yard average. That same year, Atwater finished 2nd to the Kansas City Chiefs' Derrick Thomas in Defensive Rookie of the Year voting. The additions of rookies Atwater and Bobby Humphrey, along with key free agent signings, helped Denver rebound from 8–8 in 1988 to AFC Super Bowl representative in 1989.

Atwater's second season marked the first of seven consecutive Pro Bowl selections (1990–96), tied for most in franchise history. Over his career, he was selected to the Pro Bowl eight times, second-most in franchise history. Early in his career, Atwater teamed with fellow Broncos safety Dennis Smith to form one of the best safety tandems of their generation. Both would later be inducted into the Broncos Ring of Fame. During his 10-year career in Denver, Atwater started in 155 games, tying him for seventh in franchise history for games started. He also started in 14 post-season games.

One of Atwater's career highlights happened on September 17, 1990, during a Monday Night Football telecast from Mile High Stadium in Denver, Colorado. As Kansas City Chiefs massive 260 lbs. running back Christian Okoye came through a hole in the line of scrimmage, he was met by Atwater. The resulting collision stopped Okoye in his tracks, with Atwater standing over him, taunting the proclaimed "Nigerian Nightmare", while he lay on the ground stunned. His coach Mike Shanahan stated "That's the hit people will remember him for."

In Super Bowl XXXII, he posted one of the better performances by a safety in a Super Bowl and one of the greatest games of his career. In that game, he is credited with six solo tackles, one sack, two passes defensed and a forced fumble. His presence near the line of scrimmage kept the Green Bay Packers' running game in check. His sack and forced fumble resulted in three critical points in the second quarter when the Broncos offense had stalled without star running back Terrell Davis. Near the end of the fourth quarter, the game was tied at 24 and Green Bay had the ball on 3rd down & 8. Atwater knocked down a critical pass on a blitz where the receiver was left wide open, forcing the Packers to punt. Then on Green Bay's final drive, Atwater's vicious hit (which nearly knocked out three players, including Atwater, Packers Wide receiver Robert Brooks, and his teammate, Broncos Cornerback Randy Hilliard) with less than a minute remaining left the Packers in 4th and 6 situation without any remaining timeouts, due to NFL rules regarding injuries to players in the final two minutes of a game. Many argued that Atwater should have been the MVP of the game and the ensuing article in The Sporting News pictured Atwater and noted the impact of his hits on the game.

Super Bowl XXXII was Atwater's last great game, and 1997 his last great season. In 1998, he was relegated to only playing on 1st and 2nd downs and replaced on 3rd downs. Nevertheless, because of the viewership of the Super Bowl from the previous year, he was voted as an AFC Pro Bowl starter for an eighth and final time. Following the Pro Bowl voting, the Denver Post noted that Atwater's selection to the Pro Bowl was due to his play in the previous year's Super Bowl. Denver went on to win the Super Bowl for a second straight year, marking Super Bowl XXXIII as Atwater's final game with the Broncos.

Atwater left the Broncos following the 1998 season, signing with the New York Jets as a free agent for his final season in 1999. Atwater played for the New York Jets for one season and became a free agent. He called Broncos owner Pat Bowlen, asking him if he could retire as a Bronco. He signed a one-day ceremonial contract with the Broncos before announcing his retirement from football. He thanked several of his coaches, stating "I bleed orange and will always bleed orange and blue." At the time of his retirement, he played in 155 consecutive games with the Broncos. Bowlen called Atwater one of the Broncos' "greatest players".

NFL career statistics

Legacy
Atwater was inducted to the Broncos' Ring of Fame in 2005. In 2017, Atwater was hired as both an insider for the Broncos' website as well as fan development manager.

Atwater was among 27 modern-era semifinalists for the Pro Football Hall of Fame class of 2012. He was one of four previously eligible candidates that made it to the semifinals for the first time. Atwater also made the finalist list for the 2016 and 2020 classes.

After 16 years, Steve Atwater was selected to the 2020 Hall of Fame class on February 1, 2020.

References

External links
 

1966 births
Living people
African-American players of American football
American Conference Pro Bowl players
American football safeties
Arkansas Razorbacks football players
Denver Broncos players
New York Jets players
Players of American football from Chicago
Players of American football from St. Louis
Pro Football Hall of Fame inductees
Ed Block Courage Award recipients